Rue Saint-Bernard is a street in the 11th arrondissement of Paris.

 > >
6.3110…E1126^6.3110…E1126^10=
Solveproblem: